The 2017–18 HockeyAllsvenskan season is the 13th season that the second tier of Swedish ice hockey has operated under that name. The series consists of 14 teams playing a regular season in which each team plays each other team four times, twice at home and twice away. This is followed by a series of promotion and relegation tournaments, with the teams finishing first through eight participating in promotion playoffs, and the teams finishing 13th and 14th forced to requalify to avoid relegation to the Hockeyettan.

Participating teams

Regular season

Standings

Post-season

Finals
The top two teams from the regular season will meet in a best-of-five tournament, with the winner advancing directly to the SHL qualifiers, and the losing team forced to play an additional playoff. The matches  began on 9 March and finished on 13 March.

Timrå IK vs. Leksands IF

HockeyAllsvenskan playoffs
Teams 3–8 from the regular season will play a single round-robin tournament, with teams 3–5 getting home-ice advantage. The season is then over for all but the winning team, which advances to the meet the loser of the HockeyAllsvenskan finals in a playoff to the SHL qualifiers.  Teams also started with bonus points based on their position in the regular season standings. Team 3 began with three points, team 4 with two points, and team 5 with one point.

Playoff to the SHL qualifiers
In the playoff to the SHL qualifiers, the losing team from the HockeyAllsvenskan finals will meet the winning team from the HockeyAllsvenskan playoffs in a best-of-three series that will be played on 20 March, 22 March and 24 March. The winning team will advance to the SHL qualifiers.

Leksands IF vs. IK Oskarshamn

SHL qualifiers
Two teams from the HockeyAllsvenskan and two teams from the SHL will play a best-of-seven series, with the winner qualifying for play in the 2018–19 SHL season. The winner of the HockeyAllsvenskan finals will meet team 14 from the SHL, while the winner of the playoff to the SHL qualifiers will meet team 13 from the SHL. Mora IK was the first team to win their series, 4–1, to qualify for continued SHL play. Timrå would then win their series, 4–3, to qualify for the SHL for the first time since 2012–13.

Karlskrona HK vs. Timrå IK

Mora IK vs. Leksands IF

HockeyAllsvenskan qualifiers
Västervik and Troja/Ljungby, teams 13 and 14 from the regular season, were forced to defend their spots in HockeyAllsvenskan in the HockeyAllsvenskan qualifiers. Joining the two HockeyAllsvenskan teams were four challengers from third-tier league Hockeyettan, the winner of the Hockeyettan Finals (Borlänge HF) and the three surviving teams from the Hockeyettan playoffs.

References

Allsvenskan
Sweden
HockeyAllsvenskan seasons